Michael Gunar William Sanford (born February 4, 1982) is an American football coach and former quarterback. He is the former interim head coach for the Colorado Buffaloes. He played college football at Boise State from 2000 to 2004. He then served as the head coach of the Western Kentucky Hilltoppers (2017–2018).

He is the son of former UNLV and Indiana State head coach, Mike Sanford.

Career
Previously, Sanford served as the head coach for Western Kentucky and offensive coordinator for Notre Dame. He was the offensive coordinator of his alma mater Boise State, where he played quarterback. Sanford also served numerous positions at Stanford.

On November 25, 2018, after completing his second season at the helm of the program, Western Kentucky fired Sanford.  Sanford was  hired by Utah State as their offensive coordinator after they rehired Gary Andersen following head coach Matt Wells' departure for Texas Tech.

In January 2020, Sanford was hired as the offensive coordinator and quarterbacks coach at the University of Minnesota.

In December 2021, Sanford was hired as the offensive coordinator at the University of Colorado Boulder. On October 2, 2022, Sanford became the interim head coach after head coach Karl Dorrell was fired following a 0-5 start to the season. He won his Colorado head coaching debut by defeating the California Golden Bears 20-13 in overtime. Sanford then proceeded to lose his next six games as the Buffaloes interim head coach.

Head coaching record

References

External links
 Colorado profile
 Utah State profile

1982 births
Living people
American football quarterbacks
Boise State Broncos football coaches
Boise State Broncos football players
Colorado Buffaloes football coaches
Minnesota Golden Gophers football coaches
Notre Dame Fighting Irish football coaches
Stanford Cardinal football coaches
UNLV Rebels football coaches
Utah State Aggies football coaches
Western Kentucky Hilltoppers football coaches
Yale Bulldogs football coaches
People from Lexington, Virginia